The Three Seas Initiative (3SI or TSI), known also as the Baltic, Adriatic, Black Sea (BABS) Initiative or simply as the Three Seas (Latin: Trimarium, Polish: Trójmorze), is a forum of twelve states, in the European Union, running along a north–south axis from the Baltic Sea to the Adriatic and Black Seas in Central and Eastern Europe. The Initiative aims to create a regional dialogue on questions affecting the member states.

In 2016, representatives of those states (Austria, Bulgaria, Croatia, the Czech Republic, Estonia, Hungary, Latvia, Lithuania, Poland, Romania, Slovakia, and Slovenia) met for their first summit in Dubrovnik, Croatia. At the seventh summit in Riga on June 20, 2022, Ukraine received the status of a partner-participant of the ITM, de facto becoming a participant in this initiative.

Statistics 
The twelve Three Seas countries cover 29 per cent of the European Union's territory (1,210,000 km²), are home to 25 percent of the European Union's inhabitants (110million), and produce €2.3trillion or one seventh of the EU's GDP (nominal).

History 
The Three Seas Initiative, which was influenced by the Polish interwar Intermarium concept, was launched in 2015 by Polish President Andrzej Duda and Croatian President Kolinda Grabar-Kitarović.

First summit, Dubrovnik, 2016
The Initiative's first summit, held in Dubrovnik, Croatia, on 25–26 August 2016, ended with a declaration of economic cooperation in energy and in transport and communications infrastructures. Polish President Andrzej Duda called the initiative "a new concept to promote Europe's unity and cohesion... an idea of cooperation among 12 countries located between the Adriatic, Baltic and Black Seas, the three seas of Central Europe."

Guests included Chinese Ministerial Assistant for Foreign Affairs Liu Haixing, who spoke about Three Seas Initiative interconnectedness with China's Belt and Road Initiative, and former US National Security Advisor General James L. Jones, who stressed the Three Seas Initiative's role in European development and security.

Second summit, Warsaw, 2017 
The Initiative's second summit was held 6–7 July 2017 in Warsaw, Poland. Guest attendees included US President Donald Trump. The participating countries unanimously agreed to set up a Three Seas Business Forum.

Third summit, Bucharest, 2018 
The Initiative's third summit took place 17–18 September 2018 in Bucharest, Romania. Participants approved interconnection projects in three key areas: transport, energy, and digital. Guest attendees included President of the European Commission Jean-Claude Juncker, German Foreign Minister Heiko Maas, and US Secretary of Energy Rick Perry. The first edition of the Business Forum was organised. A 3SI Network of Chambers of Commerce was created, and a letter of intent was signed concerning establishment of a Three Seas Investment Fund.

List of summits

Projects 

The initiative is closely related to two major infrastructure projects in the region:
 A north–south highway "Via Carpathia", connecting Klaipėda in Lithuania with Thessaloniki in Greece
 Liquefied natural gas infrastructure, with sea terminals in Poland and Croatia and a connecting pipeline
Other projects are the Baltic-Adriatic Corridor, Via Baltica road, Rail Baltica and Amber Rail Freight Corridor rail connections.

Three Seas Initiative Investment Fund (3SIIF)
The initial two founding institutions from Poland and Romania have committed themselves to make payments totaling more than 500 million euros. The Fund is open to other Three Seas countries, which may join it after obtaining appropriate permits. The Supervisory Board of the Fund consists of representatives of development banks from Poland, Romania, Latvia, and the Czech Republic.

In 2019, Bank Gospodarstwa Krajowego and Export–Import Bank of Romania signed the founding act of the Three Seas Initiative Investment Fund. The fund is to focus on projects creating transport, energy and digital infrastructure in the Three Seas region. Private investors from pension funds, private investment funds, and other entities will also be invited to the fund. The aim is to raise up to €3–5 billion.

The fund will engage, on a commercial basis, in infrastructure projects with a total value of up to €100 billion, while the needs of the Three Seas region have been estimated at over €570 billion.

Prior to the 2020 Tallinn Summit, United States Secretary of State Mike Pompeo pledged up to a billion dollars in financing for the Investment Fund.

Perception

Croatia
Social-democratic Croatian President Zoran Milanović stated that the initiative is harmful for Croatia.

Czech Republic
The Three Seas Initiative was at the beginning perceived by local experts and diplomats in the Czech Republic rather negatively. It was seen as a Polish attempt to create its sphere of influence (similar to the historical perception of Intermarium). Further fears were related to a possibility of deepening the East-West division in the EU and exclusion of Germany. A long term Czech objection is that there should be no competing geopolitical project in the region that would weaken the EU. Some of those objections have been partially addressed lately also due to a good experience with cooperation on infrastructure projects in the Visegrad group.

Finland
The populist Finns Party has advocated for Finland to join the initiative.

Ukraine 
In 2016, Ukraine was sent an invitation to the Three Seas Summit in Dubrovnik. However, no state representative was sent to the meeting.
In August 2019, during the visit of Ukrainian President Volodymyr Zelenskyy to Poland, he stated that Ukraine is interested in becoming an active participant in regional projects and initiatives in Poland, such as the Three Seas, which covers the Baltic, Adriatic and Black Seas. It was also noted that Ukraine is already cooperating in the construction of the trans-European Via Carpatia highway, and is discussing an ambitious E-40 waterway project for Ukraine."

In October 2019, Polish Foreign Minister Jacek Chaputowicz said that Ukraine could not now join the Three Seas Initiative, as it includes the countries of Central and Southern Europe, which are members of the European Union. The head of Polish diplomacy explained that the Three Seas Initiative should not be associated with geopolitics, as it is only an infrastructure project.

In November 2019, during the visit of the President of Ukraine Volodymyr Zelenskyy to Estonia, he stated that Ukraine is interested in joining the ITM and intends to discuss this issue with Estonian partners.

After the start of the 2022 Russian invasion during the Russian-Ukrainian War, President of Poland Andrzej Duda in his address to the Verkhovna Rada of Ukraine on May 22, 2022, stated that Ukraine should join the Three Seas Initiative. Later, on June 7, 2022, the Prime Minister of Poland, Mateusz Morawiecki, at the opening of a two-day congress of local self-government in the Three Seas in Lublin, stated that the Three Seas Initiative is impossible without involving a free and sovereign Ukraine.

At the seventh summit in Riga on June 20, 2022, speaking on video, the President of Ukraine Volodymyr Zelenskyy stated that Ukraine should become a member of the Three Seas Initiative. Zelenskyy suggested strengthening the interpretation of cooperation within the Three Seas, emphasizing the importance of logistics. Speaking about cooperation in the energy sector, Zelenskyy reminded that Ukraine has one of the largest gas storage facilities in the region. At this summit Ukraine received the status of a partner-participant of the ITM, de facto becoming a participant in this initiative.

See also 
 Amber Road
 Association Trio
 Bucharest Nine
 Central European Defence Cooperation
 Cooperation between China and Central and Eastern European Countries
 Craiova Group
 Intermarium
 Intermarium (region)
 Lithuanian–Polish–Ukrainian Brigade
 Lublin Triangle
 Northern Future Forum
 Visegrád Group

References

External links

 2020 Official website
 2019 Official website
 2018 Official website

 
Central Europe
Eastern Europe
European integration
International economic organizations
International political organizations
International security
Foreign relations of Austria
Foreign relations of Bulgaria
Foreign relations of Croatia
Foreign relations of the Czech Republic
Foreign relations of Estonia
Foreign relations of Hungary
Foreign relations of Latvia
Foreign relations of Lithuania
Foreign relations of Poland
Foreign relations of Romania
Foreign relations of Slovakia
Foreign relations of Slovenia
Central European intergovernmental organizations
2015 establishments in Europe
Intermarium
Bottom-up regional groups within the European Union
Organizations established in 2015